Stereospermum chelonoides is a deciduous tree native to South and Southeast Asia.

In Theravada Buddhism, this plant is said to have used as the tree for achieved enlightenment, or Bodhi by third Buddha called "Saranankara - සරණංකර", and twenty second Buddha "Vipassi - විපස්සි". The plant is known as පුලිල (pulila) in Sanskrit, పాదిరి (pādiri) in Telugu, පලොල් (palol) in Sinhala and পারুল (parul) in Bengali.

References

External links
 Pharmacographia indica. A history of the principal drugs of vegetable origin  Author: William Dymock

chelonoides
Trees of the Indian subcontinent
Trees of Indo-China
Taxa named by Augustin Pyramus de Candolle